Kumalak (Qomalaq) is a rural locality (a village) in Starokudashevsky Selsoviet, Yanaulsky District, Bashkortostan, Russia. The population was 141 as of 2010. There are 4 streets.

Geography 
Kumalak is located 26 km southwest of Yanaul (the district's administrative centre) by road. Yambayevo is the nearest rural locality.

References 

Rural localities in Yanaulsky District